Freedom Ship is a floating city project initially proposed in the late 1990s. The namesake of the project reflects the designer's vision of a mobile ocean colony, such that it is free from the property, municipal, or federal laws of any nation states. The project would not be a conventional ship, but rather a series of linked barges.

occupancies, duty-free shopping and other facilities, large enough to require rapid transit. The complex would have circumnavigated the globe continuously, stopping regularly at ports of call.

Construction
Freedom Ship International initially estimated the net cost for construction to be US$6 billion in 1999. However, by 2002, estimates had risen to US$11 billion. A July 2008 press release explained the difficulty of obtaining reliable financial backing. In November 2013, the company announced that the project, now with an estimated price of US$10 billion, was being resurrected, though that construction had not yet begun. In 2016, the project affiliated with Kanethara Marine in India.

Similar projects
The basic idea had been published by Jules Verne in his novel Propeller Island. No technical details were given, but the book includes the idea of building a gigantic raft. The main aim of the project was saving taxes, as the Island would move around the world on an annual basis.

Other projects, such as the ResidenSea, have similarly attempted to create mobile communities, though they have conservatively limited themselves to the constraints of conventional shipbuilding.  In regards to the economic flexibility and "freedom" created by such mobile settlements, these projects could be considered a realization of the avant-garde Walking City concept from 1964, by British architect Ron Herron of the group Archigram. The Freedom Ship also served as the inspiration for (and is closely resembled by) the Libertania, a mobile ship depicted in Grant Morrison's comic book The Filth. In the 1950s, Buckminster Fuller also proposed "floating cities" approximately a mile wide that could accommodate up to 50,000 permanent inhabitants.  Mike Wallace interviewed Buckminster Fuller on TV regarding this "floating cities" concept, which Fuller explained would free up land needed for agriculture and industrial uses.

See also 

 Seasteading, a concept applying homestead principles to the ocean, is a related process
 Azimuth thruster, the proposed drive method

References 

Proposed ships
Proposed populated places
1990s in science